Płonina  is a village in the administrative district of Gmina Bolków, within Jawor County, Lower Silesian Voivodeship, in south-western Poland.

The village has a population of 157.

Buildings of interest 
Niesytno Castle lies on a small hill near Płonina.

Gallery

References

Villages in Jawor County